is a former Japanese baseball player in Japan's Nippon Professional Baseball. Currently, he serves as the Tigers' manager.

References

 Career statistics - NPB.jp 

1968 births
Living people
Baseball people from Osaka
Nippon Professional Baseball catchers
Chunichi Dragons players
Hanshin Tigers players
Baseball players at the 2008 Summer Olympics
Olympic baseball players of Japan
Managers of baseball teams in Japan
Hanshin Tigers managers